= Esports One =

American esports data and analytics company

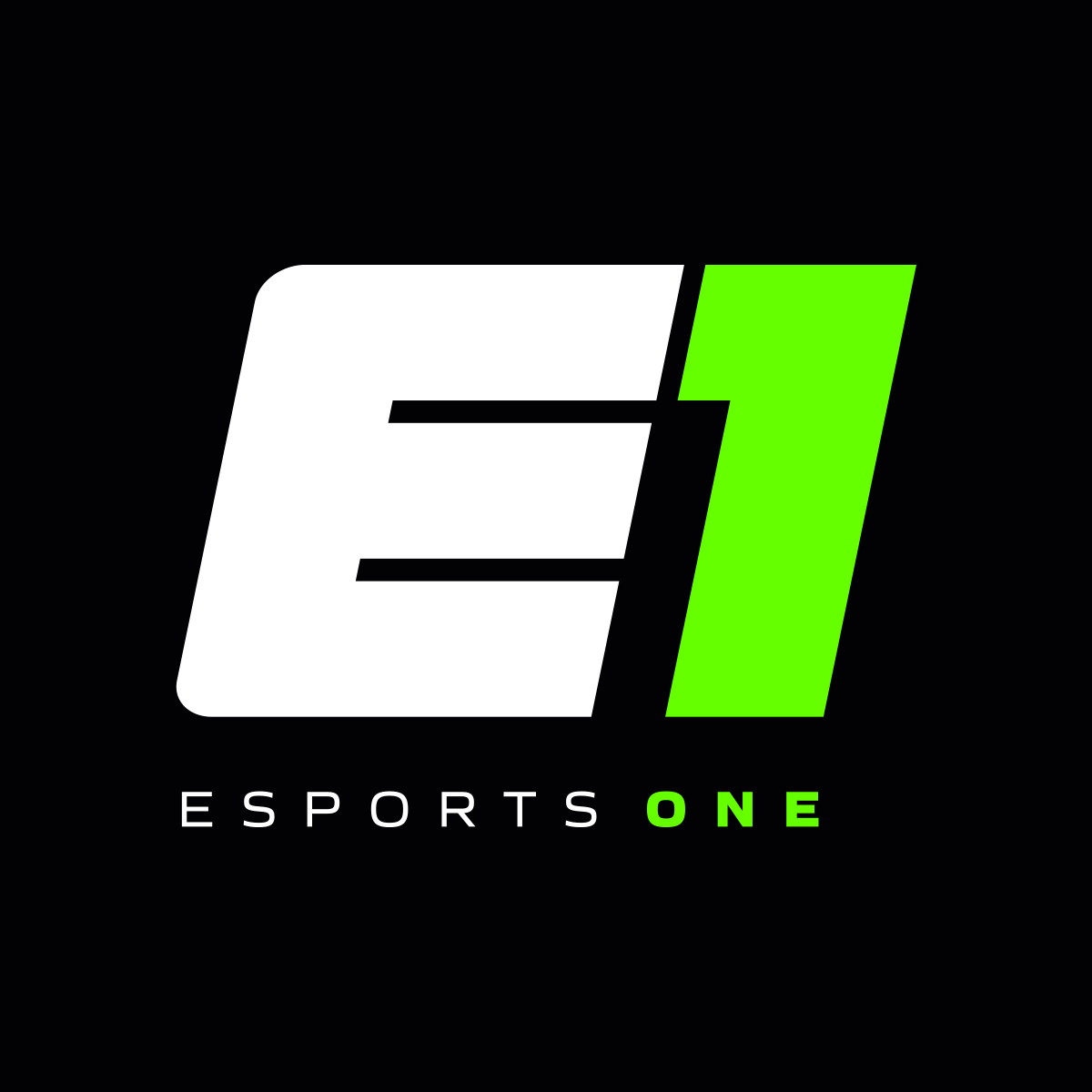
- Type: Private
- Industry: Esports, Gaming, Technology
- Founded: October 1, 2016; 10 years ago
- Founder: Matthew Gunnin
- Headquarters: Santa Monica, CA
- Website: esports.one

Esports One is an esports data and analytics company. The company is based in Santa Monica, California and was founded by Matthew Gunnin.

== History ==
On February 27, 2017, it was announced that Esports One, formerly known as Esportsology, would be part of Quake Capital's Spring Startup Accelerator for 2017. Esports One was also accepted into Play Labs, a summer accelerator at MIT that was announced on June 21, 2017.

On August 14, 2017, Esports One announced their closed-beta signups.

Esports One announced the close of their $3 million in seed funding on January 23, 2018, which was led by XSeed Capital and Eniac Ventures, with participation from Crest Capital.

== Product ==
Esports One uses proprietary computer vision technology, machine learning and custom datasets to provide real-time information for fans. This technology can capture what is happening during a live broadcast in real-time, and it takes machine learning technology to understand what is happening, and then it generates real-time information to display to the viewer.

=== OneView ===
On April 26, 2018, Esports One announced the launch of their Twitch extension, OneView, for League of Legends streams on the Twitch platform. OneView allows a Twitch streamer's viewers to make real-time predictions about what will happen in a game, earn experience for their predictions, level up and earn rewards unique to each streamer using the extension.
